The girls' singles of the tournament 2018 BWF World Junior Championships was held on 12–18 November. The defending champions of the last edition is Gregoria Mariska Tunjung from Indonesia.

Seeds 

  Wang Zhiyi (semifinals)
  Phittayaporn Chaiwan (fourth round)
  Goh Jin Wei (champion)
  Wei Yaxin (semifinals)
  Zhou Meng (quarterfinals)
  Hirari Mizui (fourth round)
  Vivien Sandorhazi (third round)
  Purva Barve (third round)

  Chasinee Korepap (third round)
  Jaslyn Hooi Yue Yann (third round)
  Reka Madarasz (second round)
  Benyapa Aimsaard (second round)
  Line Christophersen (final)
  Tereza Švábíková (third round)
  Jaqueline Lima (third round)
  Léonice Huet (second round)

Draw

Finals

Top half

Section 1

Section 2

Section 3

Section 4

Bottom half

Section 5

Section 6

Section 7

Section 8

References

2018 BWF World Junior Championships